"The Pilgrim" is an epithet associated with pilgrimage to the Holy Land:

 Bernard the Pilgrim, Frankish monk who wrote a travelogue
 Daniel the Traveller, also known as Daniel the Pilgrim, first travel writer from the Kievan Rus
 Maenghal the Pilgrim, Irish poet
 Nicholas the Pilgrim (1075–1094), Roman Catholic saint
 Richard the Pilgrim (died 720), father of three West Saxon saints

See also
 List of people known as the Traveller

Pilgrim